is an action role-playing game originally developed by Telenet Japan's "Wolf Team" as the second main title in Namco's "Tales of" series. Originally released for the PlayStation in Japan in December 1997, an English version was later made available in North America in September 1998. The game features many of the same development staff as its predecessor, Tales of Phantasia, including composers Motoi Sakuraba and Shinji Tamura, with character designs by series newcomer Mutsumi Inomata. Its producers gave it the characteristic genre name . A remake for the PlayStation 2 was released in November 2006, which was followed by an updated version called  in January 2008, both exclusive to Japan.

Reception

PlayStation version
Tales of Destiny obtained a 31 out of 40 total score from Japanese magazine Weekly Famitsu based on individual scores of 8, 7, 8, and 8, earning it the publication's Silver Award. In 2006, Famitsu readers would declare it the 79th greatest game of all time in its "All Time Top 100" feature, making it the third highest-ranking Tales game on the list. The game sold over 450,000 copies in Japan by the end of 1997, and it received a "Gold Prize" from Sony in May 1998, indicating sales above 500,000 units in Japan. It went on to sell approximately 1,139,000 copies worldwide by December 2007. It was the best-selling individual single-platform Tales game, .

The English version received generally positive reception in North America, earning a 73% average score from aggregate review website GameRankings. IGN gave the game a 7.5 of 10, stating the game was "Highly recommended, as long as you're a fan of the classic Super NES". IGN praised the game for its gameplay, story, and sound, but criticized the graphics for not being much better than what the Super NES was capable of, and the frequency of the battles. RPGFan gave the game an 88% rating overall, calling the battle system "a blast to play" and "well-balanced", but had mixed feelings on the graphics, calling it "...not even as good as some of the SNES" on in the game, but saying it improves farther into the game, stating "Transparencies, lighting, reflections and beautifully drawn textures make each area interesting". RPGamer was less enthusiastic, giving the game a 6 out of 10, calling it "a fairly good game" but not without its flaws. The battle system was praised, but the lack of originality was criticized.

GameSpot, however, was much more negative in regards to the game, giving it a 4.9 out of 10. Problems cited included "...a stale and exceedingly slow-moving story...boring, moldy characters and dry, musty dialogue..." and poor graphics, stating that it looked and sounded "...far too much like an SNES game, Tales of Destiny seems like it was originally intended to be a sequel on the SNES that got delayed well into the PlayStation's life cycle. While the game's overall poor graphics were widely criticized by reviewers, Production I.G's opening anime video did receive praise from numerous critics.

Next Generation reviewed the PlayStation version of the game, rating it three stars out of five, and stated that "Tales of Destiny is a simple yet enjoyable romp through what RPGs once were – long adventures featuring lots of character interaction and battles. And with this perspective, expect the game to be entertaining and even challenging at times."

PlayStation 2 version
The PlayStation 2 remake received a slightly higher score of 32 out of 40 from editors of Weekly Famitsu based on scores of 8, 8, 8, and 8, granting it a Gold Award. The original version sold approximately 368,000 copies in Japan by the end of 2006, while the Director's Cut would sell 142,301 copies by the end of 2008, becoming the 92nd most-bought software title in the region that year.

Legacy

The game received a direct sequel, Tales of Destiny 2, which released in 2002 on the PlayStation 2, and was ported to the PlayStation Portable in 2006. Both versions of the game were only released in Asia. It is not to be confused with Tales of Eternia which was released as "Tales of Destiny II" in North America.

References

External links
Official PlayStation version website 
Official PlayStation version website 
Official PlayStation 2 version website 
Official PlayStation 2 Director's Cut version website 

1997 video games
Cooperative video games
PlayStation (console) games
PlayStation 2 games
Action role-playing video games
Destiny, Tales of
Telenet Japan games
Video games developed in Japan
Video games scored by Motoi Sakuraba